Salvatore Sanzo (born 26 November 1975) is an Italian Olympic fencer. He won a team gold and individual silver medal in Athens and an individual bronze medal in Beijing in foil.

Biography
In 2002 he married the teammate Frida Scarpa, the couple divorced after few years.

Achievements
Olympic Games
 Foil team (2004)
 Foil individual (2004) 
 Foil individual (2008) and Foil team (2000)

World Championships
 Foil individual (2001, 2005) and Foil team (2003, 2008)
 Foil team (2005)
 Foil individual (1998) and Foil team (1997, 2006)

See also
Italy national fencing team – Multiple medallist

References

External links
 
 
 Official website

1975 births
Living people
Italian male fencers
Fencers at the 2000 Summer Olympics
Fencers at the 2004 Summer Olympics
Fencers at the 2008 Summer Olympics
Olympic fencers of Italy
Olympic gold medalists for Italy
Olympic silver medalists for Italy
Olympic bronze medalists for Italy
Sportspeople from Pisa
Olympic medalists in fencing
Medalists at the 2000 Summer Olympics
Medalists at the 2004 Summer Olympics
Medalists at the 2008 Summer Olympics
Mediterranean Games gold medalists for Italy
Mediterranean Games medalists in fencing
Competitors at the 2001 Mediterranean Games
Fencers of Centro Sportivo Carabinieri